Sir Frank Leslie Walcott, KA, OBE (16 September 1916 – 24 February 1999) was a Barbadian trade unionist, politician, ambassador and one of the eleven National Heroes of Barbados. He played a key role in organizing the Barbados labour movement and was a major figure in stimulating participation in the nation's political process.

Frank Walcott was born in Saint Peter, and his policeman father died when Walcott was very young. He was raised in Bridgetown, where he attended Wesley Hall Boys' Secondary School, excelling in mathematics and debate from an early age. Becoming an active unionist in his mid-twenties, Walcott served the Barbados Workers' Union for over fifty years. He also served three separate terms as president of the Caribbean Congress of Labour, as well as serving in the Governing Body of the International Labour Organization and as Vice-President of the Executive Board of the International Confederation of Free Trade Unions. In addition to these posts, Walcott also served with the American Institute for Free Labour Development and was Chairman of the World Employment Conference.

In politics, Walcott served as a Member of Parliament in the Barbados House of Assembly, from 1945 to 1966 and again from 1971 to 1976. He sat first as a member of the liberal Barbados Labour Party, but broke away from the party over its conservative beliefs to help establish the Democratic Labour Party in its movement towards independence and was a critical figure in its union and trade leanings. During the time between these terms he served as a Senator, and was President of that body from 1986 to 1991. After Barbados gained its independence in 1966, Walcott served as the nation's first Ambassador to the United Nations. He was appointed an Officer of the Order of the British Empire (OBE) in the 1954 Queen's Birthday Honours. In 1987 Walcott was conferred the highest honour in Barbados; he was made a Knight of St. Andrew (KA) of the Order of Barbados. 

The Sir Frank Walcott building in Saint Michael, Barbados, is named in his honour. Walcott is also noted for having been an exceptional cricket umpire.

References

Biography from Government of Barbados
Biography from the Democratic Labour Party

Notes

External links
Obituary from the International Labour Organization

1916 births
1999 deaths
20th-century Barbadian people
Officers of the Order of the British Empire
National Heroes of Barbados
Barbadian trade union leaders
Members of the Senate of Barbados
Presidents of the Senate of Barbados
Caribbean Congress of Labour
Barbadian cricket umpires
Barbadian knights
Barbadian appointees to the Order of the British Empire
People from Bridgetown
Permanent Representatives of Barbados to the United Nations
Democratic Labour Party (Barbados) politicians
Members of the House of Assembly of Barbados
Knights and Dames of St Andrew (Barbados)
People from Saint Peter, Barbados